Tamar Eilam is an Israeli-American computer scientist at IBM's Thomas J. Watson Research Center at Yorktown Heights, New York whose work for IBM centers around DevOps and configuration management.

Eilam completed her Ph.D. in 2000 at the Technion – Israel Institute of Technology. Her dissertation, Cost versus Quality: Tradeoffs in Communication Networks, was jointly supervised by Shlomo Moran and Shmuel Zaks. She immigrated to the US in 2000, after completing her Ph.D., to join IBM Research.

In 2014 IBM named her as an IBM Fellow. In 2016, Working Mother magazine named her as one of their Working Mothers of the Year.

References

External links

Year of birth missing (living people)
Living people
Israeli computer scientists
American computer scientists
American women computer scientists
Technion – Israel Institute of Technology alumni
IBM Fellows
21st-century American women